Thomas Leroy Kasat (March 24, 1956 – April 10, 2020) was an American professional wrestler, better known by his ring name, Teijo Khan/Teijho Khan. As Khan, Kasat portrayed an Asian savage despite being Caucasian. He worked as part of Paul Jones' Army in Jim Crockett Promotions and also worked for the American Wrestling Association (AWA). He was married to J. Elizabeth Freeman from 1996-2003.

Professional wrestling career
Kasat made his professional wrestling debut in 1986 portraying the Asian savage ring character Teijo Khan (also spelled Teijho Khan) despite being Caucasian. Kasat shaved his head bald and grew a thick Fu Manchu moustache to try to look more Asian. Having Caucasians portray Asian characters(or indeed having wrestlers from all manner of ethnic backgrounds portray ethnicities other than their own) were not unheard of in professional wrestling, examples such as Canadian Newton Tattrie working as Geeto Mongol or Florida native Chris Champion portraying Yoshi Kwan. As Teijo Khan he worked as a heel, wrestling term for those that portray the bad guys, as part of manager Paul Jones's Paul Jones' Army. As part of the army he teamed up with The Barbarian, The Warlord, Abdullah the Butcher, Superstar Billy Graham, Shaska Whatley, Baron von Raschke, Manny Fernandez, Rick Rude, Ivan Koloff and Vladimir Petrov as part of their storyline feud with "The Boogie Woogie Man" Jimmy Valiant, Wahoo McDaniel and Hector Guerrero. Khan and Whatley teamed up for the 1987 Jim Crockett, Sr. Memorial Cup Tag Team Tournament. They defeated Jimmy Valiant and Lazer Tron in the first round, but lost to the previous year's tournament winners The Road Warriors (Animal and Hawk) in the next round. Once the Army was dissolved Kasat resurfaced in the American Wrestling Association (AWA) in 1988, still working as Teijo Khan. In the AWA he worked as the tag team partner of Soldat Ustinov, assisting Ustinov in a storyline feud against former Army partner Baron von Raschke and later, Sgt. Slaughter as well. Also in 1988 he spent some time in the Continental Wrestling Association (CWA), at one point getting involved in a CWA Heavyweight Title match between Jerry Lawler and Jimmy Jack Funk.  In 1991 Khan won Pro Wrestling America's PWA Heavyweight Championship, defeating Charlie Norris to win the title, holding it for 69 days before losing it back to Norris.

Film appearances
In 1986, Kasat had a part in the movie Body Slam, where he portrayed a tag team, teaming with Sione Vailahi, also known as the Barbarian, managed by Captain Lou Albano. 
In 1992, he had a brief part in a movie called Equinox, where he played "I.M. Stong" and was telling people how to use a clothesline.

Death
Kasat died at his home in Spring Valley, Nevada, on April 10, 2020, at the age of 64.

Championships and accomplishments
Pro Wrestling America
PWA Heavyweight Championship (1 time)
Pro Wrestling Illustrated
PWI ranked him #257 of the top 500 singles wrestlers in the PWI 500 in 1991

References

External links 
 

American male professional wrestlers
American male film actors
1956 births
2020 deaths
Stampede Wrestling alumni
Faux Mongolian professional wrestlers
20th-century professional wrestlers